The following is a list of episodes of All Grown Up!, an American television series that ran on Nickelodeon from April 12, 2003, to August 17, 2008.

Series overview

Episodes

Pilot movie (2001)

Season 1 (2003–04)

Season 2 (2004–05)

Season 3 (2004–05)

Season 4 (2005–07)

Season 5 (2007–08)

External links 
Nick.com's All Grown Up 
Fan episode guide, with summaries and pictures

Rugrats (franchise)
All Grown Up!
All Grown Up!